The men's individual time trial event was part of the road cycling programme at the 1924 Summer Olympics.  The results of individual cyclists were summed to give team results in the team time trial event.

The field consisted of 71 cyclists from 22 countries. The course was a  loop beginning and ending at the Stade Olympique Yves-du-Manoir.

Results

Source:

References

External Links
 Video of film footage of the time trial

Cycling at the Summer Olympics – Men's individual time trial
Road cycling at the 1924 Summer Olympics